Police Doggy is an EP release by Parliament-Funkadelic/P-Funk All-Stars. The EP was released on February 10, 1995 by P-Vine Records. The EP also features a collaboration with the Scottish rock group Primal Scream. Police Doggy has never been released outside Japan. Conceptually, Police Doggy continues the theme that originated on the P-Funk All-Stars album Dope Dogs.

Track listing
"Police Doggy"  3:45
"Lost Dog Mix - 1"  9:49
"Lost Dog Mix - 2"  8:28
"Pepe (The Pill Popper)"  6:08

Personnel

Police Doggy

Vocals: George Clinton, Derrick "Frog" Rossen
Musicians: Dewayne "Blackbyrd" McKnight, Joseph "Amp" Fiddler, Michael Hampton

Lost Dog

Performed by George Clinton and Primal Scream
Vocals: George Clinton, Bobby Gillespie, Denise Johnson, Belita Woods, 
Jerome Rodgers, Charlie Wilson, Louie Kabbabie
Musicians: Bobby Gillespie, Robert Young, Andrew Innes, Dennis White, 
Henry Olsen, Steve (from Primal Scream), Martin Duffy

Pepe (The Pill Popper)

Performed by Patavian Lewis
Vocals: Patavian Lewis, Trafael Lewis, Kevin Johnson, George Clinton, 
Louie Kabbabie, Belita Woods
Musicians: Michael Hampton, Charlie Wilson, Michael "Clip" Payne, 
Joseph "Amp" Fiddler, Dewayne "Blackbyrd" McKnight, Muruga Booker, 
Perry Robinson, Cyrus Niccore

George Clinton (funk musician) albums
1995 albums